Gianmario Comi (born 5 March 1992) is an Italian professional footballer who plays as a forward for  club Pro Vercelli.

Early life
Gianmario Comi was born in Turin, Italy. His father, Antonio, is a former professional footballer, who played as a midfielder for Torino and Roma, with 246 appearances in Serie A.

Club career
In 2007, he was signed by Torino, with whom he played in the youth ranks until 2011, even appearing on the bench several times throughout the 2010–11 season.

In 2011, he was sold to Milan under a co-ownership agreement for €2.35 million and Milanese youngster, Simone Verdi, join Torino, also under co-ownership for €2.5 million. He played with the Milan Primavera (U19) throughout 2011 before going on loan to Reggina for the 2012–13 season. Comi was also the topscorer of the reserve league with 25 goals in the group stage in 2011–12 season.

He made his Coppa Italia debut for Reggina on 13 August 2012 against Nocerina and scored a goal in next Coppa match against Modena. In June 2013 the co-ownership deals were renewed. On 3 July 2013, he renewed his contract with Torino until 30 June 2017. On 31 August 2013, he scored his first goal for Novara Calcio, at the last second available in the match versus Siena, and Novara won 2‒1.

On 18 June 2014, the co-ownership between Milan and Torino was renewed for a third year. However, on 19 August Milan signed Comi outright, for an additional €150,000. On 15 July 2014, Comi was transferred to Avellino in a temporary deal.

International career
Comi made his debut in the U21 14 August 2013 in a friendly match against Slovakia. The following 5 March he played as a starter in the match won 2–0 against Northern Ireland, valid for the qualifications for the European Championships.

Career statistics

Club

References

External links
 Gianmario Comi raisport.it

1992 births
Living people
Footballers from Turin
Italian footballers
Association football forwards
Serie A players
Serie B players
Serie C players
A.C. Milan players
Reggina 1914 players
Novara F.C. players
S.S. Virtus Lanciano 1924 players
U.S. Avellino 1912 players
U.S. Livorno 1915 players
A.C. Carpi players
F.C. Pro Vercelli 1892 players
L.R. Vicenza players
Italy youth international footballers
Italy under-21 international footballers